Marlon Adriano Prezotti (born 26 February 1990), simply known as Marlon, is a Brazilian professional footballer who plays as a midfielder for Juventude.

Club career
Born in Curitiba, Paraná, Marlon left his hometown at the age of 16 and subsequently joined Villa Nova's youth setup. In 2008, he moved to Cruzeiro, but returned to his former side Villa Nova on loan in the following year.

Marlon made his professional debut on 2 March 2009, coming on as a second-half substitute for Wander Luiz in a 0–1 Campeonato Mineiro away loss against Uberaba. After featuring rarely, he subsequently served another loan stint at Formiga in 2011 before signing for Francana in 2012.

In June 2013, after representing Esportiva Guaxupé and Mamoré, Marlon moved to Sertãozinho. He then moved to Santa Rita for the 2014 Campeonato Alagoano before signing for ASA in May of that year.

On 13 January 2016, Marlon was presented at Caxias. He won the Campeonato Gaúcho Série A2 in that year with the club, and moved to Série C side Sampaio Corrêa in May 2017.

On 3 May 2018, Marlon agreed to a two-year deal with Fortaleza in the Série B, after the club paid his R$200,000 release clause. He quickly established as a regular starter for the side, helping in their promotion to the Série A and the subsequent two Campeonato Cearense titles, aside from the 2019 Copa do Nordeste winning campaign.

On 17 February 2021, free agent Marlon signed a two-year contract with Fortaleza's rivals Ceará.

Career statistics

Honours
Caxias
Campeonato Gaúcho Série A2: 2016

Fortaleza
Campeonato Brasileiro Série B: 2018
Campeonato Cearense: 2019, 2020
Copa do Nordeste: 2019

References

External links
 

1990 births
Living people
Footballers from Curitiba
Brazilian footballers
Association football midfielders
Campeonato Brasileiro Série A players
Campeonato Brasileiro Série B players
Campeonato Brasileiro Série C players
Campeonato Brasileiro Série D players
Villa Nova Atlético Clube players
Associação Atlética Francana players
Sertãozinho Futebol Clube players
Associação Atlética Santa Rita players
Agremiação Sportiva Arapiraquense players
Sociedade Esportiva e Recreativa Caxias do Sul players
Sampaio Corrêa Futebol Clube players
Fortaleza Esporte Clube players
Ceará Sporting Club players
Esporte Clube Juventude players